Akhiezer is a surname.

 Aleksander Ilyich Akhiezer (1911 – 2000), a Jewish Belarusian-Soviet nuclear physicist
 Naum Ilyich Akhiezer (1901 – 1980), a Jewish Belarusian-Soviet mathematician

See also 
 Ahiezer (biblical figure)
 Ahi'ezer (moshav)

Jewish surnames
Hebrew-language surnames

pt:Akhiezer